Yun Cho-Rong (born September 1, 1989 in Chuncheon, Gangwon) is a South Korean modern pentathlete. She also won a gold medal for the women's individual event at the 2006 Asian Modern Pentathlon Championships in Kaohsiung, Taiwan.

Yun qualified for the 2008 Summer Olympics in Beijing, where she competed as a lone female athlete in the women's modern pentathlon. During the competition, Yun struggled in the early segments, with poor scores in pistol shooting and a one-touch épée fencing, but managed to attain twenty-fourth-place finishes in freestyle swimming and show jumping. In the end, Yun finished the event with cross-country running in thirty-third place, for a total score of 4,872 points.

References

External links
UIPM Profile
NBC Olympics Profile

South Korean female modern pentathletes
1989 births
Living people
Olympic modern pentathletes of South Korea
Modern pentathletes at the 2008 Summer Olympics
People from Chuncheon
Sportspeople from Gangwon Province, South Korea